Jumbo Anonymi Etairia is a Greek company whose main operation is retail sale of toys, baby items, seasonal items, decoration items, books and stationery. The company was incorporated in 1986 and has its headquarters in Moschato, part of the Athens Urban Area.

Jumbo Group operates 86 stores, 55 of which are located in Greece, 6 in Cyprus, 10 in Bulgaria and 16 in Romania. Furthermore, the Company, through collaborations, had presence, with 27 stores operating under the Jumbo brand, in six countries (Albania, Kosovo, Serbia, North Macedonia, Montenegro and Bosnia and Herzegovina).

The company has been listed on the Athens Exchange since 19.7.1997, and since June 2010 it has participated in FTSE/Athex 20 index.

Countries with Jumbo branches

References

External links

Retail companies of Greece
Retail companies established in 1986
Toy retailers
Greek brands
1986 establishments in Greece
Companies based in Attica
South Athens (regional unit)
Companies listed on the Athens Exchange
Multinational companies headquartered in Greece